Pan Zhanchun is a Chinese pilot selected as part of the Shenzhou program. He was a fighter pilot in the People's Liberation Army Air Force and was selected to be an astronaut in 1998.

References
Pan Zhanchun at the Encyclopedia Astronautica. Accessed 23 July 2005.
Spacefacts biography of Pan Zhanchun

Living people
Shenzhou program
Year of birth missing (living people)
People's Liberation Army Astronaut Corps